Shinyalu Constituency is an electoral constituency in Kenya. It is one of twelve constituencies in Kakamega County. The constituency was established for the 1988 elections having been incepted from the larger Ikolomani constituency by then.

Members of Parliament

Wards 

The constituency has six wards, all electing councillors for the Kakamega County Council.

References 

Constituencies in Kakamega County
Constituencies of Western Province (Kenya)
1988 establishments in Kenya
Constituencies established in 1988